"Happy Does" is a song recorded by American country music artist Kenny Chesney. It was released on July 20, 2020 as the third single from his 2020 album Here and Now. The song was written by Brock Berryhill, Brad Clawson, Greylan James, and Jamie Paulin, and produced by Chesney with Buddy Cannon.

Background
Chesney said: “That line about ‘every pickle jar dollar,’” “that was me in college, playing for tips in this little bar in West Virginia. I’d rent a pretty basic sound system, go over the line, set up, play three sets, tear down and drive home, so I could turn the stuff back in at the music store, go through the drive-in, get a breakfast sandwich and get on to class.

“To do what you love, to chase a dream is a really special thing. When you’re doing that, you find a whole lot of happiness with just a little bit of something. The chorus with the rope swing, the palm tree off the rearview mirror, a kiss from someone you love... With all this unknown and all this who knows, it felt like the song people were going to need this summer. The melody feels good, and the track makes you smile! So ‘Happy Does’ is a pretty good post-it note when you’re having a bad day, or even just a day.”

Charts

Weekly charts

Year-end charts

Certifications

References

2020 singles
2020 songs
Kenny Chesney songs
Songs written by Brock Berryhill
Song recordings produced by Buddy Cannon
Warner Records Nashville singles